Slash is an autobiography written by rock guitarist Slash with Anthony Bozza.

Most of the book focuses on Slash's years with Guns N' Roses, including many rock star cliches: trashed hotel rooms, groupies, drug abuse, etc. Slash talks about Axl Rose, frontman of Guns N' Roses, and his departure from the band in the mid-1990s. He explains that Axl's inability to show up to gigs and rehearsals on time, in addition to Axl's almost dictator-like control of the band contributed to the band's downfall. Slash also states that Axl wanted to change the musical direction of the band to include more synthesizers and effects, rather than guitar-driven rock as with their earlier material.

Slash relates how he eventually achieved stability and sobriety after his second marriage and the birth of two sons.

The book's tagline is: 'It seems excessive, but that doesn't mean it didn't happen...'

Slash: The Autobiography of Slash

Slash's autobiography tells his story of playing in bands around early 1980s Los Angeles, eventually leading to the formation of Guns N' Roses, who would go on to become one of the biggest bands on the planet in the early 90s, before collapsing under their own weight.

He discusses his reasons for leaving the band, what he did after leaving, the other projects he worked on between leaving Guns N' Roses and the formation of Velvet Revolver, and the drama surrounding that band, and everything in between.

Slash also explains how he dealt with and overcame the harsh chains of addiction, and his many close calls with death because of heroin, cocaine, pills, alcohol, and more. 
He had a very bad addiction to a variety of different drugs, but was in time, able to overcome and get his life back on track.

"I've always had to do things my way; I play guitar my way; I've taken myself to the edges of life my way; I've gotten clean my way; And I'm still here. Whether or not I deserve to be is another story." - Slash

New York Times Bestseller list
The book was at #6 on the NYT Hardcover Nonfiction list as of November 25, 2007, having been published in the United States on October 30. Nikki Sixx's book, The Heroin Diaries: A Year in the Life of a Shattered Rock Star, which debuted at #7, was at #16 on the list. Slash retells some of the events from that book from his own perspective in the autobiography.

Chapter list

References

2007 non-fiction books
Music autobiographies
Autobiography
HarperCollins books
Guns N' Roses